Sven Krauß (born 6 January 1983) is a retired German professional road bicycle racer, who last rode for Team Gerolsteiner in 2008.

Tour de France 2008 
During stage 13 of the Tour de France on Krauß hit a traffic island in the fast final 10 km of the stage causing him to crash heavily with sufficient force to shatter the frame of the bike. He recovered sufficiently well to complete the stage in last position on a spare bike. The incident was caught on film and posted to numerous video sharing websites.

In 2013, Krauß became manager of the Continental team Bergstraße-Jenatec.

Major results

 Oberösterreich-Rundfahrt - 1 stage (2010)
 Rund um Düren (2010)
 Cinturón a Mallorca - 1 stage (2010)
 Regio-Tour - 1 stage (2005)
 Thüringen Rundfahrt - 1 stage (2003)
 2nd, National Team Pursuit Championship (2003)
 Ster Elektrotoer - 1 stage (2002)
  World U19 Pursuit Championship (2001)
  U17 Road Race Champion (1999)
 2nd (1998)

References

External links 
Personal website
Profile at official website

1983 births
Living people
German male cyclists
People from Herrenberg
Sportspeople from Stuttgart (region)
Cyclists from Baden-Württemberg
21st-century German people